The 2016–17 Maltese FA Trophy was the 79th version of the tournament. This version of the competition began on 3 September 2016 and ended on 20 May 2017.
For the first time since 1933 the new Malta Football Association FA Trophy was unveiled. The new trophy, which is partly financed by the English FA, was presented for the first time to the winners.

With quarterfinal victory over Pembroke Athleta, Victoria Wanderers became the first club from Gozo to advance to the semifinals.

Sliema Wanderers were the defending champions, but lost in the final to Floriana.

Format
The Maltese FA Trophy was a single elimination tournament between 65 teams. The winner of the tournament, Floriana, earned a place in the Europa League. Matches which were tied after regulation went to extra time and if still tied after that, to penalties to determine a winner.

Schedule

Preliminary round
The draw for the preliminary, first, and second rounds was held 17 August 2016.

First round
Twelve first round matches were played 9–11 September 2016.

|colspan="3" style="background:#fcc;"|9 September 2016

|-
|colspan="3" style="background:#fcc;"|10 September 2016

|-
|colspan="3" style="background:#fcc;"|11 September 2016

|}

Second round
Twenty second round matches were played 21–23 October 2016. All teams from Maltese First Division and Maltese Second Division entered the second round.

|colspan="3" style="background:#fcc;"|21 October 2016

|-
|colspan="3" style="background:#fcc;"|22 October 2016

|-
|colspan="3" style="background:#fcc;"|23 October 2016

|}

Third round
Sixteen third round matches were played between 29 November – 14 December 2016. The draw for the third and fourth rounds was held 25 October 2016. All teams from Maltese Premier League entered the third round.

|colspan="3" style="background:#fcc;"|29 November 2016

|-
|colspan="3" style="background:#fcc;"|30 November 2016

|-
|colspan="3" style="background:#fcc;"|7 December 2016

|-
|colspan="3" style="background:#fcc;"|13 December 2016

|-
|colspan="3" style="background:#fcc;"|14 December 2016

|}

Fourth round
Eight fourth round matches were played 17–18 January 2017.

Quarterfinals
Four quarterfinal matches were played 18–19 February 2017. The draw for the quarterfinals was held 20 January 2017.

Semifinals
Two semifinal matches were played 13 May 2017. The draw for the semifinals was held on 8 May 2017.

Victoria Wanderers become the first football club in Gozo to reach the semifinals of Maltese FA Trophy.

Final
The final was played 20 May 2017.

Floriana and Sliema Wanderers met in the final for the fifteenth time, having previously met in 1935, 1936, 1938, 1945, 1949, 1953, 1955, 1956, 1958, 1965, 1972, 1974, 1979 and 1993. Floriana had won eight times and Sliema Wanderers six times.

See also
2016–17 Maltese Premier League

External links
maltafootball.com
uefa.com
soccerway.com
MFA

References

Malta
Maltese FA Trophy seasons
Cup